The 2011 BWF Super Series was the fifth season of the BWF Super Series. This season marked the beginning of a three-year cycle of the event, the second after the first four-year one from 2007 to 2010.  A few changes were announced by the Badminton World Federation (BWF), as the India Open was promoted up one stage from the Grand Prix Gold level, while the Swiss Open was dropped from the Super Series. Five tournaments were promoted to become slightly higher-level Super Series Premier events with more prize money awarded than in the Super Series tournaments.

The Masters Finals were held in Liuzhou, China from December 14–18, 2011.

Schedule
Below is the schedule released by the Badminton World Federation:

Results

Winners

Performance by countries
Tabulated below are the Super Series performances based on countries. Only countries who have won a title are listed:

Finals

Malaysia

Korea

All England

India

Singapore

Indonesia

China Masters

Japan

Denmark

France

Hong Kong

China Open

Masters Finals

References

 
BWF Super Series